Orion Township is one of twenty-six townships in Fulton County, Illinois, USA.  As of the 2010 census, its population was 1,195 and it contained 518 housing units.

Geography

Unincorporated towns
 Breeds
 Rawalts
(This list is based on USGS data and may include former settlements.)

Cemeteries
The township contains these four cemeteries: Breeds, Orendorff, Red School and Wolf.

Major highways
  Illinois Route 9

Demographics

School districts
 Canton Union School District 66
 Farmington Central Community Unit School District 265
 Illini Bluffs Community Unit School District 327

Political districts
 Illinois' 17th congressional district
 State House District 91
 State Senate District 46

References
 
 United States Census Bureau 2007 TIGER/Line Shapefiles
 United States National Atlas

External links
 City-Data.com
 Illinois State Archives

Townships in Fulton County, Illinois
Townships in Illinois